Fars, FARs or FARS may refer to:

Iran-related 
 Fars Province, a province in Iran
 Dialects of Fars, a number of dialects spoken in the Fars province
Fars (East Syrian Ecclesiastical Province), former ecclesiastical province in the Church of the East
 Fars News Agency, an Iranian news agency
 The Fars, a newspaper based in Shiraz, Fars Province, first published in 1913
 Fars (newspaper), based in Shiraz, Fars Province, first published in 1872

Miscellaneous 
 Fars (river), a river in the Republic of Adygea, southwest Russia
 Fatality Analysis Reporting System, a measure of traffic fatalities in the United States
 Federal Acquisition Regulations (FARs), the rules governing purchases made by the executive agencies of the U.S. government
 Federal Aviation Regulations (FARs), FAA regulations on aviation in the United States
 Revolutionary Armed Forces of the Sahara (French: Forces armées révolutionnaires du Sahara), a Toubou rebel group in Niger

See also 
 Far (disambiguation)